Sergio Gutiérrez Ferrol (born 5 March 1989) is a tennis player from Spain. He was Spanish junior champion in 2007 and has achieved a career-high singles ranking of World No. 156 in August 2018. His best result at tour level was reaching the quarterfinals of Casablanca.

Career statistics

Singles: 2 (1-1)

Challenger finals: 1 title, 1 runners-up

Notes

References

Sources

Living people
1989 births
Spanish male tennis players
Sportspeople from Alicante
Tennis players from the Valencian Community
21st-century Spanish people